The Shin Kong Manhattan Building is a 17-story,  high-rise office building completed in 2000 and located in Xinyi Special District, Taipei, Taiwan.

See also 
 Shin Kong Life Tower
 Shin Kong Life Nangang Tower
 Xinyi Special District
 Lè Architecture
 Pxmart Headquarters

References

2000 establishments in Taiwan
Office buildings completed in 2000
Skyscraper office buildings in Taipei
Xinyi Special District